Adil Hanif (born 25 February 1978) is a Pakistani-born cricketer who plays for the Bahrain national cricket team. Hanif is a right-handed batsman who bowls right-arm off break.

Pakistani domestic career
Hanif made his List-A debut for Islamabad against Peshawar in 1998. Two years later he made his first-class debut for Islamabad against Habib Bank Limited. In the same season he played his second and final first-class match against Peshawar. From 1998 to 2002 Hanif played seven List-A matches for Islamabad, with his final List-A match for the team coming against Peshawar.

In his seven List-A matches for Islamabad he scored 103 runs at a batting average of 17.16, with a single half century score of 52 against Allied Bank Limited in 2002.

Move to Bahrain
Sometime after 2004 Hanif moved to Bahrain, where in 2009 he made his debut for Bahrain against Gibraltar in the 2009 ICC World Cricket League Division Seven held in Guernsey, where Hanif helped Bahrain to promotion to Division Six. Later in 2009 Hanif represented Bahrain in the 2009 ICC World Cricket League Division Six in Singapore, where he helped Bahrain to back-to-back promotions. In February 2010, Hanif represented Bahrain in the 2010 ICC World Cricket League Division Five, where he helped Bahrain to remain in that division.

He made his Twenty20 International (T20I) debut for Bahrain against Saudi Arabia on 20 January 2019 in Oman in the 2019 ACC Western Region T20 tournament.

References

External links

1978 births
Living people
Pakistani cricketers
Islamabad cricketers
Bahraini cricketers
Bahrain Twenty20 International cricketers
Cricketers from Lahore
Pakistani emigrants to Bahrain
Pakistani expatriate sportspeople in Bahrain